Within the study of the quantum many-body problem in physics, the DMRG analysis of the Heisenberg model is an important theoretical example applying techniques of the density matrix renormalization group (DMRG) to the Heisenberg model of a chain of spins.  This article presents the "infinite" DMRG algorithm for the  antiferromagnetic Heisenberg chain, but the recipe can be applied for every translationally invariant one-dimensional lattice.

DMRG  is a renormalization-group technique because it offers an efficient truncation of the Hilbert space of one-dimensional quantum systems.

The algorithm

The Starting Point
To simulate an infinite chain, starting with four sites. The first is the block site, the last the universe-block site  and the remaining are the added sites, the right one is added to the universe-block site and the other to the block site.

For every block, the two blocks and the two sites, there is its own Hilbert space , its base and its own operators where
  
In the following iterations, this is only true for the left and right sites.

Step 1: Form the Hamiltonian matrix for the Superblock
The ingredients are the four block operators and the four universe-block operators, which at the first iteration are  matrices, the three left-site spin operators and the three right-site spin operators, which are always  matrices. The Hamiltonian matrix of the superblock  (the chain), which at the first iteration has only four sites, is formed by these operators. In the Heisenberg antiferromagnetic S=1 model the Hamiltonian is:

For example: (convention):

The operators are  matrices, for example:

Step 2: Diagonalize the superblock Hamiltonian
At this point you must choose the eigenstate of the Hamiltonian for which some observables is calculated, this is the target state . At the beginning you can choose the ground state and use some advanced algorithm to find it, one of these is described in:
  
The Iterative Calculation of a Few of the Lowest Eigenvalues and Corresponding Eigenvectors of Large Real-Symmetric Matrices, Ernest R. Davidson; Journal of Computational Physics 17, 87-94 (1975) 
This step is the most time-consuming part of the algorithm.

If  is the target state, expectation value of various operators can be measured at this point using .

Step 3: Reduce density matrix
Form the reduced density matrix  for the first two block system, the block and the left-site. By definition it is the  matrix:

So  is formed by the most significant eigenstates of the reduced density matrix. You choose  looking to the parameter : .

Step 4: New block and universe-block operators
Form the  matrix representation of operators for the system composite of the block and left-site, and for the system composite of right-site and universe-block, for example:

Now, form the  matrix representations of the new block and universe-block operators, form a new block by changing basis with the transformation , for example:At this point the iteration is ended and the algorithm goes back to step 1.
The algorithm stops successfully when the observable converges to some value.

Further reading

See also
Heisenberg model (quantum)
Density Matrix Renormalization Group

References

Theoretical physics
Statistical mechanics